Rudino is a rural locality (a village) in Vysokovskoye Rural Settlement, Ust-Kubinsky  District, Vologda Oblast, Russia. The population was 16 as of 2002.

Geography 
Rudino is located 16 km northeast of Ustye (the district's administrative centre) by road. Novoye is the nearest rural locality.

References 

Rural localities in Tarnogsky District